is a train station located in Yanagawa, Fukuoka.

Lines
Nishi-Nippon Railroad
Tenjin Ōmuta Line

Platforms

History
October 1, 1937: Opening of the station
September 22, 1942: New operator of the station is Nishi Nippon Railroad
March 1, 1971: Renamed to present name
April 23, 1981: Renovation of the station

Adjacent stations 

|-
|colspan=5 style="text-align:center;" |Nishi-Nippon Railroad

Railway stations in Fukuoka Prefecture
Railway stations in Japan opened in 1937